Ironoquia is a genus of northern caddisflies in the family Limnephilidae. There are about seven described species in Ironoquia.

Species
These seven species belong to the genus Ironoquia:
 Ironoquia brysoni Flint
 Ironoquia dubia (Stephens, 1837)
 Ironoquia kaskaskia (Ross, 1944)
 Ironoquia lyrata (Ross, 1938) (eastern boxed-wing sedge)
 Ironoquia parvula (Banks, 1900)
 Ironoquia plattensis Alexander & Whiles, 2000
 Ironoquia punctatissima (Walker, 1852)

References

Further reading

External links

 

Trichoptera genera
Articles created by Qbugbot
Integripalpia